Krishnan Nair (25 July 1939 – 16 November 1980), better known by his stage name Jayan, was an Indian actor, naval officer, stunt performer and cultural icon of the 1970s and 1980s. He starred in over 150 Malayalam films. During his film career, he was primarily an action star and was particularly famous for his macho image and unique style. He was reputed for his masculine appeal and well known for performing stunts of a dangerous nature on his own. By the late 1970s, he became the most popular superstar, lead actor and bankable star of Malayalam cinema and has been acclaimed as the first and most successful action hero of Malayalam cinema. Jayan is widely regarded as one of the most influential superstars in the history of Malayalam cinema.

His superhero image had transformed him into a popular culture icon among Malayalis around the world, with widespread impersonations on stage and television programs based on his screen persona. It was accompanied by a cartoon, email and SMS phenomenon in the early 2000s, portraying him as a comic superhero with unique quotes of superhuman strength attributed to the action star becoming widespread. These movements were fuelled by a renewed fascination with his style of dialogue delivery and his machismo image. These were claimed to honour his memories, but were also criticised for parodying the legendary actor years after his death.

Early life

Jayan was born in Quilon, Travancore as the first child of his father Thevalli Kottaram Veetil Madhavan Pillai and mother Bharathiyamma. His birth name was Krishnan Nair. He had a younger brother named Soman Nair. Malayalam actress Jayabharathi, who was his first cousin introduced him to the film industry. Jayan's formal education ended at the 10th grade at Kollam Govt. Boys High School when he joined the Indian Navy.He was a member of the Indian Navy team to travelled to Britain in 1961 for taking India's first war ship INS Vikrant. He also played for Navy football team. His first accolades for his acting skills reached him when he was a naval sailor. He used to act in plays at various functions such as anniversaries. The encouragement from his friends and colleagues in the Navy gave him the desire to act in films. Jayan served in the Indian Navy for 16 years, culminating in the rank of Master CPO. By the end of his navy days, he had begun efforts to start small businesses at Ernakulam and became a regular inhabitant of the Cochin Tourist Home. During his life at Ernakulam, he would meet some of his lifelong friends. It was such a chance meeting while on leave, with Rajan Prakash who is the veteran Malayalam actor Jose Prakash's son, who owned a dry cleaning shop in Cochin, that eventually landed him a role in the movie Shapa Moksham. A year later, he left the Indian Navy and started trying his hand at various civilian jobs, working for companies in Cochin for a few years till his acting career began to succeed. Jayan's younger brother Soman Nair (Ajayan) also acted in 20+ films after Jayan's death. But he was not successful in films like Jayan. Ajayan died in the year 2000 at the age of 56. Ajayan has 3 children and his younger son Adithyan Jayan is a famous TV serial actor in Malayalam.

Career

Random appearances and early career 
Jayan did make a few random uncredited appearances in some films during the early 1970s. According to his nephew, he had the role of a vampire-like character in an unnamed project costarred by Vidhubala, which was never released. His first appearance with the name Jayan was in the movie Shapamoksham, which is usually credited as his first film.

Rise to fame 
The name "Jayan" ( "The Victor") was given to him by veteran Malayalam actor Jose Prakash on the sets of Shapamoksham. Jayan got his first major break appearing as a villain in Panchami (1976), playing a forest ranger. Jayan's performance in this film was appreciated in the industry and his physical appearance was also noticed for the first time. His next notable role was in Thacholi Ambu (1978), in which he appeared in a supporting role. In the same year, he acted as a sage in the Sreekumaran Thampi film Etho Oru Swapnam, which was well received by critics. He also appeared in the 1978 horror film Lisa, in a supporting role. But what made Jayan a superstar was his antihero role in Sarapancharam (1979, Bed of Arrows). He catapulted to fame riding on machismo roles that endeared him to the masses, and he established himself as one of the most popular Malayalam film actors of his time with superhit movies like Chaakara (1980), Love in Singapore (1980), Paalattu Kunjikkannan (1980),  Naayattu (1980), Manushya Mrugam (1980) and Angadi (1980) the latter of which was the highest grossing film of the year. He is generally regarded as the first action hero in Malayalam cinema.

Superstardom 
Sarapancharam broke all box-office records set in the Malayalam movie industry till it's time and became the highest-grossing movie of 1979. Its box-office records were broken by another Jayan film, Angadi in the following year, which cemented his popularity among the masses. In films such as Aavesham and Manushya Mrugam he played double roles. During his career, he received only a few critically appreciated roles perhaps partly due to his commercial hero image and partly due to the lack of films that garnered critical appreciation at the time. The focus was always on his unmatched drawing power as an action star and by 1980, at the peak of his career, he had attained a genuine superhero image. Movies exploited Jayan's masculine physique and he appeared bare-chested in numerous scenes. His on-screen attire (most famously his Elvis bellbottoms), his masculine image and later the nature of his death transformed him into a legendary pop culture icon in Kerala. Jayan was also known for his unique method of dialogue delivery and he has contributed many memorable lines to the Malayalam film history.

Multistar films 
Jayan acted in several ensemble cast movies, mostly with Prem Nazir. The duo acted in films such as Naayattu, Love in Singapore, Chandrahasam, Thacholi Ambu, Kannappanunni, Paalattu Kunjikkannan, Maamaankam, Prabhu etc. all of which were top-grossing movies at the box office. He also acted with other popular actors of the time, such as Soman, Sukumaran and Madhu in many films. In early films before 1979 (e.g. Thacholi Ambu and Panchami), he had negative or supporting roles. But later films in the beginning of 1980 relied heavily on Jayan's drawing power as an action hero and placed him as the central character. In 1980, the duo Jayan and Prem Nazir were cast in Ariyapedatha Rahasiyam by P. Venu, that showcased the most famous fight scene in Malayalam cinema. Prem Nazir agreed to play a supporting role in Naayattu, which was very unlikely for a superstar of those times. He had agreed to do this as a token of friendship with Jayan and the director Sreekumaran Thambi. The duo acted together many action films  such as Irumbazhikal, Love in Singapore etc. where the box office draw was huge.

Death

In the peak of his career, on 16 November 1980, Jayan died in an accident on the set of the movie Kolilakkam ( Shockwave) at the age of 41 years, 3 months and 21 days. The climactic scene of the movie was being filmed in Sholavaram, near Madras, Tamil Nadu. Jayan always performed his own stunts, and for this movie he was performing a rather dangerous stunt that involved him boarding an airborne helicopter from a moving motorbike driven by Sukumaran. The shot was accepted by the director in the first take; Nonetheless, another three shots were filmed.

According to the film's production executive, Jayan insisted on yet another re-take as he was not satisfied with its perfection. During the re-take, the helicopter lost its balance and crashed along with Jayan who was hanging onto the landing skids, and he later succumbed to his injuries.

After his death was confirmed, a slide was added during the theatre show of his movie Deepam, which was running in packed houses, informing viewers of his death. A large number of his fans burst into tears and ran out of the buildings, while many continued to watch the movie, refusing to believe it and taking it for an ingenious promotion for some upcoming project.

Jayan's body was taken to Trivandrum via aeroplane and later it was taken to his home in Quilon, where he was cremated. Thousands paid homage to the actor, and the police had to take huge measures to deal with the crowds. His mother Bharathiyamma became bedridden after this incident, and she too died two years later. Soman Nair, his younger brother, died in 1999.

Some conspiracy theories emerged regarding the circumstances of his death, primarily because the pilot and his co-star Balan K. Nair, who was in the helicopter, survived with minor or no injuries. Nevertheless, it has been confirmed as a genuine accident.

The Aftermath

After Jayan's death, several films were released claiming to be his last film, including the genuine one, Kolilakkam. In all these films, Jayan's voice was dubbed by Alleppey Ashraf, a popular impressionist of the time. Many projects meant for him were recast, such as Thushaaram by I. V. Sasi, P. G. Vishwambaran's Sphodanam, and Sasi Kumar's Dhruvasangamam. Numerous other projects were cancelled entirely. One stunt scene and two songs were already shot with Jayan for C. V. Rajendran's Garjanam, but after his death, it was recast with Rajinikanth, becoming his second film in Malayalam released in 1981.

Imposter Movement
Due to his unrivalled popularity that continued many years after his death, random bit scenes were added to numerous films that showed random gestures or shots of him walking by the side during fight scenes. Attempts were made to bring in impostors who tried to imitate his style and mannerisms, enabling several artists from the field of mimicry to show up on the big screen. But these experiments failed miserably, and proved especially ineffective in fight and stunt scenes. Then, directors and producers started a search for new actors to replace him. This movement led to debuts of actors who resembled Jayan in physical appearance (e.g. Ratheesh), those with stage names sounding similar to his (for example, his own brother who appeared as Ajayan), and those with similar mannerisms and style (e.g. Bheeman Raghu).

However, all these attempts to replace Jayan with a new star with a similar image yielded disappointing results. It is now one of the most popular quotes in Malayalam cinema "Jayan's throne remains vacant and will forever be so".

Resurgence in the 2000s
In the late 1990s and early 21st century, there was a resurgence of Jayan's screen persona in Kerala and his old movie scenes came to prominence again. It was owed mostly to programs by popular mimicry stage artists in the State, whose imitations of the star's mannerisms caught on and soon became commonplace in college stage events, television programs and mimicry stage shows along with quotes of superhuman strength known as Jayan quotes. However, it has been pointed out that many grotesquely imitated screen dialogues of Jayan are not actually his, but that of dubbing artist Aleppy Ashraf, who dubbed for many of his characters post his death.

The "comeback" of Jayan and his renewed popularity lately may be taken as an affirmation that Jayan has not been replaced even nearly three decades after his death. Today, Jayan is best remembered as the first and best action star of Malayalam cinema, so far, besides his trademark colourful attire, risky stunts, machismo mannerisms and unique speaking style. He has rightly won immortality in the hearts of the Malayalam film fans as a martyr in his yearning to thrill and entertain them even by putting his life at stake. Madhu, a famous actor prominent in the 1960s, once stated in an interview: "Jayan will forever be young and alive. No one can ever visualise him as an old man."

A film titled Avatharam presently under production, is attempting to bring back his screen persona using advanced technologies. A documentary on Jayan's life and death Jayan – The Man behind the Legend is nearing completion for release in the near future.

Legacy
Jayan is perhaps the only actor thus far in the history of Malayalam film industry who remains a marketable superstar decades after his demise, to this day. In the state of Kerala, he is a true icon of popular culture, whose life and image has made him a legend over time.

Superhero image and commercial success
Through his machismo roles and staggering stunt feats, Jayan had attained a real-life Superhero image amongst the fans, masses and colleagues alike. His colourful attire and unique bass voice also helped him capture the imagination of the average viewer as the manly action hero. Along with these, his trademark styles and mannerisms made him a campus hero and youth idol of his time. Summing up, Jayan's image among the masses was that of a daring superhuman who would perform seemingly impossible deeds and accomplish extraordinary feats.

Jayan is the most commercially successful superstar to date in the Malayalam industry with a near 90% success rate. The years 1979, 1980 and 1981 became known as "Jayan years" in the industry due to the widespread release and success of his movies. His films Sharapancharam and Angadi, released in 1979 and 1980 respectively, were record breakers and became the highest grossers of their respective years. His final film, Kolilakkam was the highest grosser in 1981. The noteworthy point is that a large percentage of films released during his peak years lacked a strong plot and were mostly cheap low budget remakes of successful movies from other language sectors of Indian cinema. Many of these films came out astoundingly successful due to his sheer presence and some avoided failures due to his small cameo appearances. Thousands of fans used to visit theatres repeatedly just to see his fascinating stunts and fight scenes.

Daredevilry
Jayan was a high-risk taker and throughout his career, he was popular for stellar performances in a fight and stunt sequences. Dangerous and thrilling stunts were often featured in action films with Jayan in the lead. These were usually highlighted during fight scenes as added promotions to his machismo image and daredevilry. Numerous movies in which he has acted have one or more notable stunt performances.

A few prominent examples may be Puthiya Velicham ("New Light", 1979) in which he performs train stunts jumping onto and from a fast-running goods train, Aavesham ("Inspiration", 1979) which shows the actor swimming through the dangerous waters of Hogenakkal Falls, through a major part of the climax sequence without using any kind of safety measures. Movies like Thadavara ("Prison", 1981) and Sharapancharam (1979) demonstrate his brilliant horse riding skills performing almost effortlessly on horseback, while films like Maamaankam involved dangerous fights with wild animals. In a film called Moorkhan ("Cobra", 1981) he broke through a brick wall riding on a motorbike (a Royal Enfield Bullet) and it also featured sequences that had the actor sliding along ropes tied at high elevations. Perhaps the most famous movie stunt featuring Jayan came in Chandrahasam ("Moonsword", 1980) in which he held on to the UV clamp of a massive ship crane and was elevated to a height of around 200 feet before jumping off to the top of the vessel. In one of his final stunt scenes, in Ariyappedatha Rahasyam ("Secret never known", 1981) he was involved in a fight scene with an elephant.

Influence on Malayalam cinema
The meteoric rise of Jayan had literally a texture changing impact on the Malayalam film industry. It changed forever the hero concept that existed previously for many years and gave rise to a new genre of film characters with more manly characteristics. The National Film Archive of India, in a tweet writes: "Jayan, an action star of the 70s is remembered for his heroic style & ability to perform daredevil stunts."

Memorable roles
Most critics often consider Jayan's main hero role in Sharapancharam, Angadi, Venalil Oru Mazha and Puthiya Velicham to be his best. His most popular character may be the educated labourer in Angadi. The sage's role played by him in Etho Oru Swapnam was well appreciated by critics and would easily feature among his most memorable roles. The supporting role in Kannappanunni, Thacholi Ambu, the villainous ranger in Panchami and the rapist in Kanthavalayam are also critically acclaimed performances. Some other popular roles were in films like Idimuzhakkam, Venalil Oru Mazha, Ithikkara Pakki, Maamaankam, Puthiya Velicham, Karimpana, Ariyapedatha Rahasiyam, Chaakara and Kazhukan. While acknowledging his undisputed popularity as a commercial superstar that has never faded over time, general critical opinion on his skills as an actor is divided. While there are criticisms from some corners that he depended more on his features such as his catching physique, bass voice, personal charisma, unique style and mannerisms to garner attention, many others rate him as a great actor who developed his own unique style to leave a lasting impression on every single role he took up. The fact that his peak time as an actor lasted only a few years is often pointed out in reply to criticisms, and considering the short period of his active film career, he may have delivered more critically appreciated performances than most of his contemporaries. But these were always under the shadow of a large majority of films that were able to achieve commercial success capitalising on his drawing power, but had weak plots and less critical acclaim. Some believe that if he'd had a longer career, he would have eventually transformed into a great character actor over time who could excel in commercial and parallel streams alike, after a period of decline in Malayalam films that followed Sathyan's demise. His most popular films like Sharapancjaram and Angadi were both critical and commercial successes. Though he is remembered as an icon of commercial cinema, due to the short span of his career and the generic nature of commercial hero roles of the time, his actual acting talents may have been largely underutilised.

Song sequences
Film songs are an integral part of Indian cinema and the same is true for Malayalam films. Jayan has acted in several memorable song sequences which bring about nostalgic memories about the actor. Song sequences in Jayan films also helped shape the future film song sector in commercial cinema. The song "Kannum Kannum" in the film Angadi presents one of the most popular song sequences in Malayalam cinema involving Jayan and Seema. Its success led to the teaming together of this pair in numerous movies. Another popular song involving the Jayan-Seema pair is "Kasthuri Manmizhi" from the movie Manushya Mrugam. A song that hit tremendous popularity was "Cham Chacha Chum Chacha" in Love in Singapore and Kombil Kilukkum ketti in "Karimpana". The mass popularity of this song sequence later inspired a whole new category of film songs with lyrics that lack any particular meaning, but with a fast beat and dance appeal that came to be known as "Adipoli" songs. There is a song in the film Etho Oru Swapnam called "Oru Mugham Mathram Kannil", which became popular due to its melodious and nostalgic nature.
"Ezham Malika Mele" from Sarppam, directed by Baby was a superhit song paired by Jayan and Seema. Another hit from this team was "Pournami Penne" in Arifa hassan's Benz Vasu and it was hummed by the youth of that time.

Memorials
Kollam District panchayath and Government of Kerala built a new conference hall near to Kollam District panchayath office in Kollam municipal corporation as a memorial to the legend actor. The hall is named as "Jayan Memorial Hall". It was inaugurated on 12 September 2020.

There is a Jayan memorial Arts & Sports club functioning at Thevally near the actor's hometown. The residential area at his birthplace has been renamed "Olayil Jayan Nagar" in his honour.

Jayan Cultural Forum
Jayan Samskarika Vethi or Jayan Cultural Forum has been established recently, which consists of his fans and well wishers. It is headed by the actor's nephew Kannan Nair, and aims at uniting his diverse fan base consisting of young and old people from several generations under a single platform. Activities include organising anniversary functions and memorial programs, facilitating his coworkers, maintaining the actor's website and official profiles and charity work.

Monuments

In 2009, an 8 ft high statue of the actor was erected in front of his house at Olayil, Kollam which is now a nursing home. Efforts are being made to construct a permanent memorial at Mulankadakam where he was cremated, and also to open a library and museum near his home.

Jayan memorial club and a Jayan memorial National highway waiting shed consisting of all Jayan film names and pics built by fans in Thrissur.

Jayan's Wax statue is unveiled at the Sunil Wax Museum in the state capital of Thiruvananthapuram in 2022.

In media

Media on Jayan
 A book titled Jayan Americayil? (Jayan in America?) came out in 1981 and had record sales at the time. It circulated the rumour that Jayan was alive in America with an injured eye and that it was a look-alike who was killed in the accident.
 Another book Jayante Maranam Kolapathakamo (Jayan's death, a murder) was also published in 1981, capitalising on the conspiracy theories and mystery surrounding the superstar's death.
 The actor's life was serialised in a Malayalam film magazine and then brought out as Jayante Katha.
 An elaborate biography named Jayan : Abhralokathintey Ithihasa Naayakan is being completed and will reportedly be published in 2011.
 A documentary Jayan-The Man behind the Legend is under production and is set to be released in 2011.

In popular culture

Print media
 The actor's domination and commercial success in the 1970s is mentioned in the book Because I have a Voice. It focuses on Jayan's masculine image.
 Jayan's famous emotional English dialogue in street slang is included at number 7 in Outlook magazine's Terrific 13 lists published in the 13th anniversary edition of the magazine, in the section '13 Cheesiest Chalkiest dialogues in Indian Cinema'.

Films
 In the movie Aye Auto, there is a reference to Jayan's English dialogue in Angadi.
 The movies Dupe Dupe Dupe and Aparanmaar Nagarathil had Jayan impersonators in the lead.
 In the film Pattanathil Bhootham, the popular Jayan song sequence Cham Chacha Chumchacha is played out with impersonation. The horse oiling scene from Sarapancharam is also reconstructed.
 In Chotta Mumbai, a Jayan-Nazir mixed song sequence is played out with Jayan attire used in the song sequence of the popular Nazir song Chettikulangara.
 In the film Shikkar, Jayan's image is used in the sets of a fight scene in a bid to stress the adventurous setting of the film.
 In Thanthonni, Jayan's voice and dialogue tone is imitated.
 The film Valiyangadi was promoted as a sequel to Jayan's Angadi.
 In the film Ennu Ninte Moideen, Jayan's stunt sequence and the celebrated row with "Alavalathi Shaji" from the film Lisa is shown in a theatre scene. 
 The famous song "Kannum Kannum" from Jayan's film Angadi is included with Mammooty impersonating Jayan's style in the film Venicile Vyapari.
 The recent hit Kattappanayile Rithwik Roshan has the actor Siddique acting as an ardent fan of Jayan and impersonates his style for seeing his movies.

Return to the silver screen
In December 2010, on the occasion of the 30th anniversary of his death, it was announced that a new movie with Jayan in the lead is in the works, using advanced animation and graphics technologies. The movie, titled Avatharam (Incarnation), was announced to be directed by Vijeesh Mani and scripted by T. A. Shahid. The project is inspired by the star's posthumous popularity as an action legend. It was announced that the actor would be brought back to the big screen by twelve top technicians from Hollywood.

Filmography

See also
 Jayan quotes

References

External links

Profile of Malayalam Actor Jayan

Further reading

 http://www.malayalachalachithram.com/profiles.php?i=48
Jayan Nostalgia homepage at Manorama Online portal
 Image gallery
Jayan Anniversary Special at Mathrubhumi portal
"Jayan: Love You All" – an article in the November 2009 issue of Vanitha magazine

1980 deaths
Male actors from Kollam
Indian stunt performers
Filmed deaths of entertainers
1939 births
Male actors in Malayalam cinema
Indian male film actors
20th-century Indian male actors
Indian Navy personnel